The Central Atlantic Collegiate Conference (or CACC) is a college athletic conference affiliated with the National Collegiate Athletic Association (NCAA) at the Division II level.  Its fourteen member institutions are located in the northeastern United States in the states of Connecticut, Delaware, New Jersey, New York, and Pennsylvania.

The CACC was founded in 1961 as an athletic conference affiliated with the National Association of Intercollegiate Athletics (NAIA), and later joined the NCAA in 2002 on provisional status. The CACC Conference Office has been located in New Haven, Connecticut since 2004, the same year that it upgraded to full active status. The CACC has three full-time staff members and one part-time.

History

Chronological timeline
 1961 - The Central Atlantic Collegiate Conference (CACC) was founded. Charter members included Bloomfield College, Adelphi Suffolk College (later Dowling College), The King's College, the C.W. Post Campus of Long Island University, Southampton College of Long Island University, Marist College, Monmouth College of New Jersey and Nyack College, effective beginning the 1961–62 academic year.
 1965 - St. Thomas Aquinas College joined the CACC, effective in the 1965–66 academic year.
 1981 - Marist left the CACC to join the Division I ranks of the National Collegiate Athletic Association (NCAA) and the ECAC Metro Conference (now known as the Northeast Conference), effective after the 1980–81 academic year.
 1982 - Dominican College of New York (now Dominican University New York) joined the CACC, effective in the 1982–83 academic year.
 1983 - Georgian Court College (now Georgian Court University) joined the CACC, effective in the 1983–84 academic year.
 1985 - Monmouth (N.J.) left the CACC to fully align with the NCAA Division I ranks and join the ECAC Metro, effective after the 1984–85 academic year.
 1987 - Caldwell College (now Caldwell University) and Post College (now Post University) joined the CACC, effective in the 1987–88 academic year.
 1999
 St. Thomas Aquinas left the CACC to join the NCAA Division II ranks as an NCAA D-II Independent (which would later join the New York Collegiate Athletic Conference (NYCAC, now the East Coast Conference), effective beginning the 2000–01 academic year.), effective after the 1998–99 academic year.
 Felician College (now Felician University), Goldey–Beacom College, Holy Family College (now Holy Family University), the University of the Sciences in Philadelphia (USP; later the University of the Sciences before being absorbed by Saint Joseph's University in 2022) and Wilmington College of Delaware (now Wilmington University) joined the CACC, effective in the 1999–2000 academic year.
 2000 – The New Jersey Institute of Technology (NJIT) joined the CACC, effective in the 2000–01 academic year.
 2002 – The CACC was granted provisional membership status within the National Collegiate Athletic Association (NCAA) at the Division II ranks, transitioning from the National Association of Intercollegiate Athletics (NAIA), effective in the 2002–03 academic year.
 2004 – The CACC had achieved full membership status within the NCAA Division II ranks, effective in the 2004–05 academic year.
 2005 – Philadelphia University (now Thomas Jefferson University) joined the CACC, effective in the 2005–06 academic year.
 2006 – NJIT left the CACC to join the NCAA Division I ranks as an NCAA D-I Independent, effective after the 2005–06 academic year.
 2007 – Chestnut Hill College joined the CACC, effective in the 2007–08 academic year.
 2009 – Concordia College of New York joined the CACC, effective in the 2009–10 academic year.
 2017 – The CACC began sponsoring men's lacrosse, with play starting in the 2018 season (2017–18 school year).
 2021 – Concordia (NY) left the CACC as the school announced that it would close, effective after the 2020–21 academic year.
 2022
 USciences left the CACC when it merged into Saint Joseph's University at the end of the 2021–22 academic year.
 The University of Bridgeport joined the CACC at the start of the 2022–23 academic year.
 The CACC added bowling, a women-only sport in the NCAA, effective in 2022–23, with full members Bloomfield, Caldwell, Chestnut Hill, Felician, Holy Family, and Wilmington as the inaugural teams. All but Holy Family, which launched its varsity team in 2022–23, had previously been affiliates of the East Coast Conference in that sport.

Member schools

Current members
The CACC currently has 13 full members, all of which are private schools:

Notes

Former members
The CACC had nine future full members, all but one were private schools:

Notes

Membership timeline

Sports

Men's sponsored sports by school

Women's sponsored sports by school

Other sponsored sports by school

References

External links